Hydroxyphenylpyruvate synthase may refer to:
 Prephenate dehydrogenase, an enzyme
 Chorismate mutase, an enzyme